Mohammad Kashif Hussain (born 3 December 1984) is a Dutch cricketer. He is a right-handed batsman and a slow right-arm offbreak bowler.

He made his debut for the Dutch cricket team in an ICC Intercontinental Cup game against Kenya on 29 March 2006. His One Day International debut for the Netherlands came against Sri Lanka on 4 July 2006. He has also represented the Netherlands A and Under-23 teams.

External links

1984 births
Living people
Netherlands One Day International cricketers
Netherlands Twenty20 International cricketers
Pakistani emigrants to the Netherlands
Dutch people of Punjabi descent
Cricketers from Khanewal
Dutch cricketers